In functional analysis and related areas of mathematics, a BK-space or Banach coordinate space is a sequence space endowed with a suitable norm to turn it into a Banach space. All BK-spaces are normable FK-spaces.

Examples

The space of convergent sequences  the space of vanishing sequences  and the space of bounded sequences  under the supremum norm 

See also

References

Banach spaces
Topological vector spaces